Chickie is a feminine nickname. Notable people associated with this name include the following:

Given name
Angela Marie Chickie Geraci Poisson, (born 1931), American field hockey player and coach
Jessie Wanda Chickie Williams (née Crupe, 1919 – 2007), American country musician 
Charlotte Mason (coach), nicknamed "Chickie" (1945 – 2011) women's basketball and softball coach

Fictional characters
Chickie, character in Rocky V, played by Kevin Connolly
Chickie Brown, regular character on Seasons 1-3 of Southland (TV series) played by Arija Bareikis

See also

Chic (nickname)
Chica (name)
Chick (nickname)
Chicka (disambiguation)
Chuckie (name)
Chykie Brown